Lindsey v. Miller, 3 U.S. (3 Dall.) 411 (1799), was a United States Supreme Court case in which the Court held that: "The fact that the land demanded in a suit was granted by and is claimed under a State, does not make the State a party to the suit, within the meaning of the second section of the third article of the constitution. Nor does an issue upon the point whether the land demanded is within the limits of the State.

A certiorari does not issue to remove a cause, on account of want of jurisdiction in the court in which it is pending."

Background
The state of Virginia issued patents or deeds for land north of the Ohio River. After the deeds were issued, Virginia ceded that territory to the federal government which subsequently organized the area as the Northwest Territory and, later, as the State of Ohio. The case resolved around Virginia's standing to protect those deeds.

References

External links
 

United States Supreme Court cases
United States Supreme Court cases of the Ellsworth Court
United States property case law
1799 in United States case law
Borders of Virginia
Borders of Ohio
Northwest Territory
1799 in the Northwest Territory